Chal Chala Chal is a 2009 Hindi-language family satire film with Govinda in the lead role. The film is a remake of the 1989 Malayalam-language Indian film Varavelpu starring Mohanlal and many scenes from another Malayalam film Ee Parakkum Thalika.

Plot

A story of a simpleton whose life changes when he becomes the owner of a private bus. Deepak is a simpleton. He has been switching jobs as he does not want to succumb to the corrupt system. Since years, with unwavering efforts, financial hardships and an unshaken faith in the judicial systems, he has been helping his father Omkarnathji in a legal matter.

Omkarnathji, the ex-principal of a private school, is fighting a court case against the school to get his due provident fund and pension. He later wins the case and the school is ordered to give a part of its property as compensation, but there is no money in its funds.
And thus Deepak's life gets an addition: a bus.
Instead of selling it off, acting on his father's advice, he decides to run the bus. While the rest of the family members - two sisters: Chhaya and Aprana and their Ghar Jamai husbands Vinayak Agrawal, a Lawyer and U.U. Upadhyay are against it. They feel it's a low profile job. Their primary interest is in selling off the huge bus and devouring their share of property.
But Deepak has immense trust in his father's judgment. Sundar a jolly good sweetheart, who is desperately trying for an American Visa, is also an age old friend. He comes in handy with initial investments and they establish a company, Chal Chala Chal transport.
And so begins the ride of their lives.
The bus is in a dilapidated condition and much of money is gone for the repairs.
It's a roller-coaster ride where mishaps are more than the commuters. The bus driver, Basantilal wears thick glasses and the conductor Harilal has a sugar factory in his mouth and an eye for cash... adding to it like a cherry on the triple-decker pastry- Sunder's enmity with a rat which has eaten his passport.
Corruption chases Deepak in transport business as well U.U. Upadhyay is a chief vehicle inspector. He tried his level best to harass Deepak and extort money, raising troubles.
These workers are messing up Deepak's life and business, but he can't raise a finger against them, for they are under the cushioned wings of the Union Leader Mr. Singh.
Their only relief should have been the lovely lady on the bus Payal, but the bus hits her fracturing her leg. Now she is also in the vengeance mode, extorting money from Deepak.
What saves Deepak from these mad house characters, is his faith in his principles and his father's love-acting as the strong backbone in bitter sweet times.

Cast
 Govinda as Deepak O. Nath (bus owner)
 Rajpal Yadav as Sunder Lala
 Reema Sen as Payal Ghosh
 Razak Khan as Basantilal (Bus Driver)
 Murli Sharma as Gajendra Singh (Union Leader)
 Asif Basra as Harilal Ahuja (Bus Conductor)
 Manoj Joshi as Uttam Upadhyay
 Upasna Singh as Chhaya U. Upadhyay
 Asrani as Advocate Vinayak Agrawal
 Amita Nangia as Arpana V. Agrawal
 Om Puri as Omkarnath
 Satyajit Sharma as Nirmal Kumar
 Veerendra Saxena as Banwari - Tailor
 Firdaus Mewawala as the Judge
 Dolly Bindra - cameo

Music
The cassettes and audio CD's were released by Venus Records & Tapes LTD.
The soundtrack lists are as below-

"Aplam Chaplam Ho Gayi Re" - Sunidhi Chauhan, Joi Barua
"Chanchal Hai Aankhein Tumhaari" - Sadhana Sargam, Shaan
"Gaanv Ke Pipal Tale" - Vinod Rathod
"Money Bhi Hai, Honey Bhi Hai" - Anand Raj Anand, Sneha Pant
Naacho Don't Se Bas, Gaao Don't Se Bas" - Anu Malik, Shaan

References

External links
 

2009 films
2000s Hindi-language films
2000s sports comedy films
Films scored by Anu Malik
Films scored by Sunil Jha
Films scored by Anand Raj Anand
Indian sports comedy films
Hindi remakes of Malayalam films
2009 comedy films